The 2017 Five Star Movement leadership election was an Italian online primary election held on 21 September 2017 that determined the M5S candidate to the premiership for the 2018 Italian general election.

After the election, the 31 years old Luigi Di Maio was elected candidate to the premiership and political head of the movement.

Background
The party's leader Beppe Grillo, would campaign in the 2018 election, but he would not be the candidate for the position of Prime Minister, even if many critics accused him of being, in case of an electoral win, the de facto head of the government. The Vice President of the Chamber of Deputies Luigi Di Maio, was widely considered as the "front runner" and the most likely candidate for the premiership of Italy.

Luigi Di Maio had been often labeled as the most pragmatic and "institutional", but also the less populist, Five Star politician; he is the son of a member of the neo-fascist Italian Social Movement and he is considered the leader of the moderate and "governmental" faction of the movement.

No other leading members of the M5S, such as Alessandro Di Battista (a populist politician, personal friend of Di Maio) or Roberto Fico (leader of the M5S left-wing faction and rival of Di Maio and Di Battista), ran for the office.

Di Maio's opponents were the Senator Elena Fattori (Vice President of the 9th Permanent Senate Committee) and six other city councilors. Many of them were almost unknown and this caused a lot of criticism, both from the Democratic Party, Lega Nord and Forza Italia, which considered this ballot a false primary election, with the only aim of appointing Di Maio as M5S candidate without any real challenger.

Candidates

Major candidates

Other candidates

Results

References

2017 elections in Italy
Political party leadership elections in Italy
Five Star Movement
Five Star Movement leadership election